In 1999–2000 Saudi First Division, the second-tier league of football in Saudi Arabia, was won by Al-Ansar F.C. of the Medina region. Along with Al-Qadisiyah they were promoted to the Saudi Professional League.

Teams

Final league table

Relegation play-offs
Al Taawon, who finished 8th, faced Najran, who finished 9th for a two-legged play-off.

First leg

Second leg

4–4 on aggregate. Al Taawon won 6–5 on penalties.

External links 
 Saudi Arabia Football Federation
 Saudi League Statistics
 goalzz

Saudi First Division League seasons
Saudi
2